Mojtaba Rahmandoust is an Iranian conservative politician who served a member of the Parliament of Iran from 2012 to 2016, representing Tehran, Rey, Shemiranat and Eslamshahr.

He was formerly a presidential advisor for war veteran affairs.

References

1954 births
Living people
Members of the 9th Islamic Consultative Assembly
Deputies of Tehran, Rey, Shemiranat and Eslamshahr
Society of Devotees of the Islamic Revolution politicians
Academic staff of the Faculty of World Studies
Presidential advisers of Iran
Volunteer Basij personnel of the Iran–Iraq War